The year 1886 in architecture involved some significant architectural events and new buildings.

Events
 Patrick Manogue, Sacramento's first bishop, acquires the land to build the Cathedral of the Blessed Sacrament in the United States, designed by Bryan J. Klinch.

Buildings and structures

Buildings opened

 June 30 – Founder's Building at Royal Holloway College for women, Egham, near London, designed by William Henry Crossland.
 July – Neuschwanstein Castle in Bavaria, designed by Christian Jank and realized by Eduard Riedel, is opened to the public, although incomplete.
 October 28 – Statue of Liberty in New York Harbor, United States, designed by Frédéric Auguste Bartholdi with engineering by Gustave Eiffel and Maurice Koechlin.
 October 31 – Dom Luís Bridge in Porto, designed by Téophile Seyrig.

Buildings completed
 Iowa State Capitol in Des Moines, designed by John C. Cochrane and Alfred H. Piquenard
 National Assembly building in Sofia, designed by Konstantin Jovanović.
 Hotel Cecil, London, United Kingdom, designed by Perry & Reed.
 Hawick Town Hall, Scotland, designed by James Campbell Walker.
 Oulu City Hall, Finland, designed by Johan Erik Stenberg.

Awards
 RIBA Royal Gold Medal – Charles Garnier.
 Grand Prix de Rome, architecture:  Albert Louvet (First Prize & Second).

Births
 March 24 – Robert Mallet-Stevens, French architect (died 1945)
 March 27
 Ludwig Mies van der Rohe, German-American architect (died 1969)
 Clemens Holzmeister, Austrian architect and stage designer (died 1983)
 June 17 – George Howe, American International Style architect and educator (died 1955)
 July 27 – Ernst May, German architect and city planner (died 1970)
 Yehuda Magidovitch, Ukrainian-born Israeli architect (died 1961)

Deaths
 April 18 – Sancton Wood, English railway station architect (born 1815)
 April 27 – Henry Hobson Richardson, American architect (born 1838)
 July 17 – David Stevenson, Scottish lighthouse engineer (born 1815)
 October 6 – E. W. Godwin, English architect and designer (born 1833)
 November 4 – George Devey, English country house architect (born 1820)

References

Architecture
Years in architecture
19th-century architecture